F. ferruginea may refer to:
 Fimbristylis ferruginea, the rusty sedge, a plant species
 Freziera ferruginea, a plant species endemic to Peru

Synonyms
Fagus ferruginea (disambiguation) may refer to one of the beech tree species:

 Fagus ferruginea Dryand., a synonym for Fagus grandifolia subsp. grandifolia (American Beech) 
 Fagus ferruginea var. caroliniana Loudon, also a synonym for Fagus grandifolia subsp. grandifolia
 Fagus ferruginea Siebold (Invalid), a synonym for Fagus crenata Blume (Japanese beech)

See also
 Ferruginea (disambiguation)